Remy Vandeweyer (27 July 1928 – 30 March 1967) was a Belgian footballer. He played in two matches for the Belgium national football team in 1956.

References

External links
 

1928 births
1967 deaths
Belgian footballers
Belgium international footballers
Place of birth missing
Association football midfielders